The 1995 Sacramento State Hornets football team represented California State University, Sacramento as a member of the American West Conference (AWC) during the 1995 NCAA Division I-AA football season. Led by first-year head coach John Volek, Sacramento State compiled an overall record of 4–6–1 with a mark of 3–0 in conference play, winning the AWC title. The team was outscored by its opponents 377 to 255 for the season. The Hornets played home games at Hornet Stadium in Sacramento, California.

Schedule

References

Sacramento State
Sacramento State Hornets football seasons
American West Conference football champion seasons
Sacramento State Hornets football